Yang Peiyi (born 21 February 2001) is a Chinese former child singer.

Biography 
Yang attended The Primary School Attached to Peking University.

At the 2008 Beijing Olympics Opening Ceremony, 7-year-old Lin Miaoke appeared on stage, lip-synching to Yang's pre-recorded voice. The vast majority who watched the broadcast were unaware of Yang's role until music director, Chen Qigang, revealed several days later that Lin was sent on stage in place of Yang.

Yang's first album was released in September 2009.

In October 2009, Yang performed a medley of two songs (one of which was tailor-made for the poem Looking up at the Starry Sky written by the PRC Premier Wen Jiabao) at the Cultural Show in Celebration of the 60th Anniversary of the Founding of the People's Republic of China (香港同胞慶祝中華人民共和國成立六十週年文藝晚會) together with Jacky Cheung, Yao Jue and Leon Ko.

References 

2001 births
Living people
2008 Summer Olympics
Chinese child singers
Singers from Beijing
21st-century Chinese women singers
High School Affiliated to Renmin University of China alumni